Chud is an East Slavic word for medieval Finnic peoples.

CHUD or Chud may also refer to:

CHUD.com, or Cinematic Happenings Under Development, an American film review website
Chud Lake, on the border of Estonia and Russia
Battle of Chud Lake, 1242
CHUD Tools, a set of software tools to measure software performance on Mac OS X

Fiction
C.H.U.D. (Cannibalistic Humanoid Underground Dwellers), a 1984 horror film
C.H.U.D. II: Bud the C.H.U.D., a 1989 sequel to C.H.U.D.
The Ritual of Chüd, part of the 1986 novel It by Stephen King

People
Dr. Chud (born 1964), American drummer for punk rock band Misfits
Rob Chudzinski (born 1968), American football coach